Trading Mom, also known as The Mommy Market, is a 1994 American fantasy comedy film written and directed by Tia Brelis, based on her mother Nancy Brelis' homonymous book. It stars Sissy Spacek, Anna Chlumsky, Aaron Michael Metchik, Maureen Stapleton, and André the Giant in his final film appearance. It grossed $319,123 at the box office and received mostly negative reviews from critics.

Plot
Jeremy, Elizabeth, and Harry Martin are three children who have had it up to here with their nagging mother...a divorced strict workaholic who rarely spends quality time with, or even speaks to, them - except to criticize or scold them ever since her husband left. During their last day of school, things start to become a disaster. Principal Terrance Leeby busts Jeremy for defending Harry against Ricky Turner, the school bully, who gets off scott-free; he also busts Harry, who hasn't done anything wrong, and then finds Elizabeth holding - but not smoking - a friend's cigarette. He contacts Mrs. Martin and schedules an appointment for a home visit for the first day of summer vacation. They go to Mrs. Cavour, a mysterious elderly woman who works as a gardener. She tells them of an ancient spell that will make Mrs. Martin disappear...along with all their memories of her, but warns them that erasing someone is very dangerous. Upon returning home, they are unfairly grounded for the entire summer vacation with no camp, allowance, TV, or anything by infuriated Mrs. Martin.

That evening, Jeremy, Elizabeth, and Harry recite the spell...which indeed works overnight. The next morning, Principal Leeby shows up at their house. He demands that Mrs. Martin come in for a chat regarding the trouble at school yesterday. Since they (for obvious reasons) can't explain what has happened to her, they make up a story about her leaving early for an emergency. Principal Leeby becomes suspicious and decides to contact social services after knowing that they are hiding something from him. Mrs. Cavour tells them of a place in town called the Mommy Market, where practically any breed of mother imaginable can be found. Their policy, however, is that every customer (or party of customers) receives three tokens...each of which is good for taking home one mother at a time. There is also a Daddy Market, but a customer can't go there too as it would be a fiasco. If a customer does not find a suitable mother before running out of tokens, he or she can never return.

Jeremy, Elizabeth, and Harry select (in order): a wealthy-but-fussy French woman; an attentive-but-competitive nature-hiker; and a fun-but-wild Russian circus performer. Each set various standards, which neither Jeremy, Elizabeth, or Harry (nor any of their friends) can possibly live up to. After their third mother leaves, Principal Leeby returns with Dr. Richardson, a social worker, who advises that Jeremy, Elizabeth, and Harry need to be placed in separate foster homes, much to their shock. They seek out Mrs. Cavour. She explains that the spell can only be broken if they collectively recall something about Mrs. Martin.

Seeing no other way out, Jeremy, Elizabeth, and Harry rush to the Market, try to find their real mother for a fourth time, and chaos ensues. Edward, the manager, tongue-lashes them for breaking the rules; they are ejected permanently. Discovering that Principal Leeby has called the police to investigate Mrs. Martin's disappearance and finding them to put them in separate foster homes, they run back to the Market only to find everything and everyone gone. They try to remember a fun memory that they had with Mrs. Martin. They do so and happily bring her back. They bring her flowers from Mrs. Cavour. She tries to remember why she grounded them the day before, but can't. She also tells them that Principal Leeby is coming over to visit. They find it to be the first day of summer vacation and the day after they recited the spell. They are now ready to dismiss everything that happened as a bizarre dream. Outside, Principal Leeby drops by to speak with Mrs. Martin about the problems Jeremy, Elizabeth, and Harry (supposedly) caused at school. He is snared by an animal trap that the nature-hiker mother made to capture a raccoon.

Cast
 Sissy Spacek as Mrs. Martin/Mama, the snappy French woman/Mom, the nature-hiker/Natasha, the circus performer
 Aaron Michael Metchik as Jeremy Martin
 Anna Chlumsky as Elizabeth Martin
 Asher Metchik (Aaron's real-life brother) as Harry Martin
 Maureen Stapleton as Mrs. Cavour
 André the Giant as the Circus Strongman
 Merritt Yohnka as Principal Terrance Leeby
 Sean MacLaughlin as Edward, the Mommy Market's manager
 Schuyler Fisk (Sissy's real-life daughter) as Suzy
 Anne Shannon Baxter as Lily
 Andrew Largen as Ricky Turner, the school bully
 Nancy Chlumsky (Anna's real-life mother) as Dr. Gloria Richardson, the social worker
 Ariana Metchik (Aaron and Asher's real-life sister) as the Girl Scout
 Igor De Laurentiis (producer Rafaella's real-life nephew) as the boy in the black jacket

Reception
On Rotten Tomatoes the film has an approval rating of 38% based on reviews from 8 critics.

The film was mentioned in Siskel and Ebert's Worst of 1994 episode. Siskel personally chose it; both he and Ebert gave the picture two thumbs down, describing it as "Depressing...too dreary and lame to be any fun...All of Spacek's multiple roles are disturbing and awkward; as a result, so is the film."

Motion picture-historian Leonard Maltin gave the film one-and-a-half (out of a possible four) stars. "This should have been a whimsical fantasy/morality lesson; instead, it's flat and lifeless, with poor production values. Although Spacek has a field day in four wildly different variations on a single role, the humiliation scenes will make you wince. There's always something wrong with a film that sits unreleased for two years, as this one did."

Home Video Release

Vidmark Entertainment released the film on VHS, on October 18, 1994.

References

External links
 
 
 

1994 films
1990s fantasy comedy films
American fantasy comedy films
1990s children's fantasy films
Films shot in Virginia
Films produced by Raffaella De Laurentiis
Films scored by David Kitay
Trimark Pictures films
1994 comedy films
1990s English-language films
1990s American films